A box score is a structured summary of the results from a sport competition. The box score lists the game score as well as individual and team achievements in the game.

Among the sports in which box scores are common are baseball, basketball, football, volleyball and hockey.

Background
The box score data is derived from a statistics sheet, and is then summarized into a contingency table, also known as a cross tabulation or cross tab or as a basic set of averages. This is used to help determine the relationship between elements, and in sports, certain percentages often help define the success of a team. This information is then correlated to a player, or a team where it is read to obtain a general idea of how the game was played or how the player performed during the game, a season, or their career.

Early implementation 
Prominent baseball journalist Henry Chadwick is credited with creating the modern baseball box score in 1859. In addition to the creation of the Chadwick boxscore, Chadwick also coined the baseball term "strike-out." The first game with the box score implemented was in 1859, featuring the Brooklyn Excelsiors versus the Brooklyn Stars, with the Brooklyn Stars being the victor.

Terminology
 
Baseball
See Box score (baseball)
Basketball
In the sport of basketball, the box score is used to summarize/average the data of Games played (GP),  Games started (GS), Minutes Played (MIN or MPG), Field-goals made (FGM), Field-goals attempted (FGA), Field-goal percentage (FG%), 3-pointers made (3PM), 3-pointers attempted (3PA), 3-point field goal (3P%), Free throws made (FTM), Free throws attempted (FTA), Free throw percentage (FT%), Offensive Rebounds (OREB), Defensive Rebounds (DREB), Total rebounds (REB), Assists (AST), Turnovers (TOV), Steals (STL), Blocked shots (BLK), Personal fouls (PF), Points scored (PTS), and Plus/Minus for Player efficiency (+/-). Advanced analytics has led to the creation of an advanced NBA boxscores for both teams and players. Advanced team NBA box scores have been displaying advanced statistics such as: Assist to turnover ratio (AST/TO), True shooting percentage (TS%), Offensive Rating (OFFRTG), and Defensive Rating (DEFRTG) since the 1996-1997 NBA Season.

Volleyball 

 In volleyball, a box score is used as a statistical scoring summary of the match. The starting six players of each respective team, with the visiting team listed first, is listed on the left side of the box score. This is followed by players that substituted into the match below the starting six. A volleyball boxscore summarizes the Games played (GP), Kills (K), Errors (E), Total attempts (TA), Hitting percentage (PCT), Assists (A), Service ace (SA), Service error (SE), Reception error (RE), Dig (DIG), Block solo (BS), Block assist (BA), Blocking error (BE), Ball handling errors (BHE), and Total team blocks.

Football 

 In football, a wide variety of box score statistics are used to illustrate both team and individual performances. A football boxscore is divided into the following categories: passing statistics, rushing statistics, receiving statistics, yards from scrimmage statistics, return statistics, kicking statistics, punting statistics, and defensive statistics.

References

Terminology used in multiple sports